The Heart of Shimmer Championship (stylized as Heart of SHIMMER Championship) is a women's professional wrestling championship in Shimmer Women Athletes. Championship reigns are determined by professional wrestling matches, in which competitors are involved in scripted rivalries. These narratives create feuds between the various competitors, which cast them as villains and heroines.

History 
The Heart of Shimmer Championship is a secondary women's professional wrestling championship that is used in Shimmer Women Athletes for shimmer women's athletes and talent. The tournament for the title took place in the year 2016 where Nicole Savoy won to become the Inaugural championship holder of the title.

Inaugural championship tournament (2016)

First round tournament matches 
 Cheerleader Melissa defeated Leva Bates
 Candice LeRae defeated Cherry Bomb
 Nicole Savoy defeated LuFisto by submission 
 Kimber Lee defeated Jessicka Havok
 Heidi Lovelace defeated Veda Scott
 Nicole Matthews defeated Crazy Mary Dobson

Semi-final tournament matches 
 Candice LeRae defeated Cheerleader Melissa
 Nicole Savoy defeated Kimber Lee by submission
 Heidi Lovelace defeated Nicole Matthews

Tournament final three-way elimination match 
 Nicole Savoy defeated Candice LeRae and Heidi Lovelace by submission

Reigns

See also
Shimmer Championship
Shimmer Tag Team Championship

References

External links

Heart of Shimmer Championship

Women's professional wrestling championships
Shimmer Women Athletes